Aforia kupriyanovi is a species of sea snail, a marine gastropod mollusk in the family Cochlespiridae.

Distribution
This marine species is found off Northern Chile.

References

 Tucker, John K. "Catalog of Recent and fossil turrids (Mollusca: Gastropoda)." Zootaxa 682 (2004): 1–1295.

External links
 BioLib: Aforia kupriyanovi 
 Kantor Y.I., Harasewych M.G. & Puillandre N. (2016). A critical review of Antarctic Conoidea (Neogastropoda). Molluscan Research. DOI: 10.1080/13235818.2015.1128523

kupriyanovi
Gastropods described in 1987
Endemic fauna of Chile